Kashima Kikō, variously translated as Kashima Journal or A Visit to Kashima Shrine is a haibun travel journal by the Japanese poet Matsuo Bashō, covering his short journey to Kashima Shrine in the Kantō region. According to write-translator David Landis Barnhill, the Kashima Kikō is "most significant for the amusing but complex self-image near the beginning" where Bashō compares his companions to a bird and a mouse before calling himself a mixture of both: a bat.

It was written as a tribute to Bashō's Zen master, Buchhō, and so it contains direct references to enlightenment and the Gateless Gate. The work mostly does not integrate poems into the prose and, instead, presents all the prose in the first half before ending with a series of hokku written by Bashō and his friends.

Summary
Written in October of 1687 (Edo era), the work covers a 45-year old Bashō's journey to Kashima Shrine to see the harvest moon. The journal is inspired by a poem from Teishitsu of Kyoto, imagining the exiled Ariwara no Yukihira viewing the moon. Traveling with a monk and the ex-samurai, Sora (who later accompanied Bashō on most of his Oku no Hosomichi journey), Bashō and company board a boat, hire a horse, and pause to view Mount Tsukuba. After lodging in a fisherman's hut, the trio embark to Kashima but are met with incessant rain. Spending the night at an old priest's home, Bashō wakes at the flush of dawn and rouses the others to see the moon breaking through the storm clouds.

English translations

References

Edo-period works
Japanese poetry collections
Travel books
Articles containing Japanese poems
Haiku